The Porcher House is a historic home in Cocoa, Florida. It is located at 434 Delannoy Avenue. On January 6, 1986, it was added to the U.S. National Register of Historic Places.

Built in 1916 by Edward Postell Porcher as a home for his wife, Byrnina M. Peck, the historic house is an excellent example of 20th century classical revival architecture, adapted to the Florida climate. The ten bedroom house is composed of native coquina rock, and finished in the interior with teak, oak, and cedar.  In the 1950s, the city of Cocoa obtained the house from the Porcher family and turned it into the City Hall. It is currently rented out for special occasions.

Porcher was a pioneer in the citrus industry and is credited with being the first to wash, grade and inspect fruit. His wife was the first postmistress of Merritt Island.

Footnotes

External links
Brevard County listings at National Register of Historic Places
Florida's Office of Cultural and Historical Programs
Brevard County listings
Porcher House

Cocoa, Florida
Houses in Brevard County, Florida
National Register of Historic Places in Brevard County, Florida
1916 establishments in Florida
Houses completed in 1916